The relationship between the Republic of Korea and the United Kingdom of Great Britain and Northern Ireland spans from the 19th century to the present day. Although the Republic of Korea gives 18 January 1949 as the date of the establishment of formal relations with the United Kingdom, diplomatic ties go back to 1883. British military participation in the Korean War during the 1950s was significant, but relations between the two countries at the time were described as "tenuous", with relatively little known about each other. Commercial and trade relationships grew rapidly during the 1970s. During the Asian Financial Crisis in the late 1990s, Queen Elizabeth II made a state visit to South Korea, which was well received at a time of crisis in the country. Today, there are strong economic and diplomatic links between the two countries.

According to a 2014 BBC World Service Poll, 74% of South Koreans view the United Kingdom's influence positively, with 14% viewing the UK negatively. On the other hand, opinion of South Korean influence is divided in the United Kingdom, with 45% of Britons viewing South Korea's influence positively, and 45% viewing them negatively.

History
Three Royal Navy ships briefly occupied Geomun Island in 1885. The relationship between the two nations broke off during the period of Japanese colonial rule in Korea between 1910 and 1945. After the Second World War, South Korea established diplomatic ties with the United Kingdom on 18 January 1949. The United Kingdom and other British Commonwealth Forces fought alongside South Korea during the Korean War. Almost 100,000 British servicemen fought in the Korean war. Their most famous involvement was the Battle of the Imjin River, a confrontation with Chinese soldiers. 600 soldiers of the British Army took on a force of 30,000 Chinese troops crossing the Imjin River in Korea. At the end of the battle 10,000 Chinese troops had fallen. British losses stood at just 59 and this battle is considered a turning point in the war as it halted the Chinese advance. The Gloucester Valley Battle Monument is a memorial for British soldiers killed at Solma-Ri, South Korea. 1,078 British soldiers died fighting in the Korean war.

There is a British embassy in Seoul and a South Korean embassy in London. The UK and South Korea cooperate in world events with other nations such as the United States. They have recent military relations and the UK often supports South Korea's view during periods of turbulent North Korea–South Korea relations. There were about 17,000 South Koreans living in the United Kingdom in 2011.

In November 2016, the Republic of Korea Air Force conducted a domestic air combat manoeuvering exercise with the British Royal Air Force and the United States Air Force. This was the first such exercise with a foreign nation other than the United States.

High-level exchanges
From the Republic of Korea to the United Kingdom:
 1986 April President Chun Doo-hwan
 1989  November President Roh Tae-woo
 1995  March President Kim Young-sam  
 1998  April President Kim Dae-jung  
 2001  December President Kim Dae-jung
 2004  December President Roh Moo-hyun  
 2006  February Minister of Foreign Affairs and Trade Ban Ki-moon
 2006  June Minister of Foreign Affairs and Trade Ban Ki-moon
 2006  May Deputy Prime Minister for Economic Affairs Han Duck-soo
 2007  May Deputy Prime Minister for Economy Affairs Kwon Oh-kyu  
 2007  June Chairman of Financial Supervisory Service Yoon Jeung-hyun    
 2008  May Chairman of Financial Supervisory Service Jeon Kwang-woo  
 2008  May Minister of Strategy and Finance Kang Man-soo
 2008  October Presidential Special Envoy Sa-Kong-il
 2009  February Presidential Special Envoy Sa Kong-il   
 2009  April President Lee Myung-bak (G20)  
 2010  January Minister of Foreign Affairs and Trade Yu Myung-hwan
 2010  May Minister of Health and Welfare Jeon Jae-hee
 2013  April Special envoy of the president former prime minister Han Seung-soo (to attend the funeral of former British prime minister Margaret Thatcher)
 2013  November President Park Geun-hye
 2014  December Minister of Foreign Affairs and Trade Yun Byung-se

From the United Kingdom to the Republic of Korea:
 1986 May Prime Minister Margaret Thatcher
 1992  November Prince Charles and Princess Diana
 1996  March Prime Minister John Major
 1997  April Duke of Gloucester
 1997  October Duke of Kent
 1999  April Queen Elizabeth II
 2000  October Prime Minister Tony Blair
 2003  July Prime Minister Tony Blair
 2001  April Duke of York
 2005  November Duke of York
 2006  October Deputy Prime Minister John Prescott
 2008  September Duke of York
 2008  December G20 Special Envoy Timms
 2009  October Minister of Business, Innovation and Skills Peter Benjamin Mandelson
 2010  November Prime Minister David Cameron
 2012  March Deputy Prime Minister Clegg (to attend Seoul Nuclear Security Summit)
 2013  October Secretary of State for Foreign and Commonwealth Affairs William Hague (to attend Seoul Conference on Cyberspace 2013)

See also 
 Foreign relations of South Korea
 Foreign relations of the United Kingdom
 Korean Britons
 British Commonwealth Forces Korea
 KATCOM

References

External links
South Korean Embassy in London
Embassy of the Republic of Korea in the United Kingdom of Great Britain and Northern Ireland
The official website of the British Embassy in the Republic of Korea
- YouTube

 
Korea, South
United Kingdom
South